Morning Cloud was the name given by the British politician Edward Heath to a series of five yachts which he owned between 1969 and 1983.

The yachts

No. 1
Sparkman and Stephens S&S 34, length 34 ft., year of launch 1969. Edward Heath won the Sydney to Hobart Yacht Race with this boat in the same year. She was sold in December 1970 to Stewart Benest of Jersey, who renamed her Nuage de Matin. She sank off Gorey Castle, Jersey, on 2 September 1974, after the seas took her from her moorings.

No. 2
Designed by Sparkman and Stephens, length 42 ft., hull and deck material wood (mahogany), constructed by Lallows (UK), year of launch 1971. Heath used the boat in the Admiral's Cup of that year as part of the winning British team. At least two copies of the boat were built under licence from him.

No. 3
Designed by Sparkman and Stephens, length 44 ft. 9 ins., hull and deck material wood, constructed by Lallows (UK), year of launch 1973. It was used in the Admiral's Cup of that year, but Heath was only on board for the Fastnet race because of other commitments. It was lost at sea on 5 September 1974 when it was hit by a large wave while en route to Cowes from Burnham-on-Crouch. Heath was not on board. Two of the seven crew drowned. It was insured by Lloyd's of London. This was only three days after Morning Cloud I (see above) sank.

No. 4
Designed by Sparkman and Stephens, length 45 ft., hull and deck material aluminium, constructed by Allday Aluminium of Gosport and Camper and Nicholsons (yard number 1390), year of launch 1975.

No. 5
Designed by Ron Holland, length 44 ft., hull and deck material composite, year of launch 1977. In the 1979 Fastnet race (which was part of the Admiral's Cup) it lost its rudder and failed to finish. Heath sold the boat in 1983.

References

External links

Photographs of Morning Cloud
 Yacht no. 3- photo-aphoto-b
 Yacht no. 4- photo-a photo-b photo-c

Individual sailing vessels
Sailing in the United Kingdom
Maritime incidents in 1974
Maritime incidents in 1976
Edward Heath